The Nen River or Nenjiang, or  Nonni is a river in Northeast China. The Nen River flows through the northern part of Heilongjiang Province and the northeastern section of Inner Mongolia, some parts of the river forming the border between the two regions. At  in length, the Nen River is the longest tributary of the Songhua River. 

The Nen River  flows in the general southern direction in a wide valley between the Greater Khingan and the Lesser Khingan mountain ranges in the west and east, respectively, and meets the Second Songhua River near Da'an to form the Songhua River.

The river is prone to flooding, as occurred most recently in 1998 and 2005.

Tributaries
Major tributaries of the Nen River include:
 Gan River (甘河) (Right)
 Nemor River (讷谟尔河) (Left)
 Nuomin River (诺敏河) (Right)
 Wuyuer (乌裕尔河)/Nuyur River (Left)
 Yalu River (雅鲁河) (Right)
 Chuoer River (Right)
 Taoer/Chaor River (洮儿河) (Right)
 Huolin River (霍林河) (Right)

Cities
 Nenjiang (Mergen), named after the river
 Qiqihar
Jiangqiao

History
During the Qing Dynasty the Nenjiang provided an important communication route between southern Manchuria and the cities of Qiqihar and Mergen, both of which served at various points as capitals of the Qing Heilongjiang. A portage road connected the upper reaches of the Nenjiang with Aigun on the Amur as well.

In November 1931, the bridge over the Nen River near Jiangqiao became the site of one of the first battles of the Second Sino-Japanese War.

External links
 Flooding of the Nen river - picture of 2005-07-21
 The tributaries of the Nen River
 Maps of the Amur -Heilong River basin, including the "Hydrography of Amur-Heilong River basin" map showing the course of the Nenjiang in detail.

References

Rivers of Heilongjiang
Rivers of Inner Mongolia
Songhua River